Giyan (also Romanized as Gīyān; also known as Kīān, Qīān, and Qayān) is a city and capital of Giyan District, in Nahavand County, Hamadan Province, Iran. At the 2006 census, its population was 8,062, in 1,999 families.

References

Populated places in Nahavand County

Cities in Hamadan Province